Fukushima is a Japanese surname. Notable people with the surname include:

, Japanese sprinter
, Japanese manga artist
, Japanese voice actor
, Japanese Zen Buddhist
, Japanese cyclist
Kunihiko Fukushima, Japanese computer scientist
, Japanese science fiction editor, translator and writer
, Japanese daimyō
, Japanese photojournalist
, Japanese politician, chairperson of Social Democratic Party
, Japanese fashion model and actress
, Japanese swimmer
, Japanese cyclist
, Japanese long-distance runner
, Japanese neurosurgeon
, Japanese general
, Japanese badminton player
, former Japanese announcer, wife of Ichiro Suzuki

Japanese-language surnames